Camden County Courthouse is a historic county courthouse in Camden, an unincorporated area in Camden County, North Carolina, USA. The courthouse was built in 1847; it is a single-storey brick building in the Greek Revival style. It features a pedimented porch and large windows.

It was listed on the National Register of Historic Places in 1972.

References

External links

Historic American Buildings Survey in North Carolina
Courthouses on the National Register of Historic Places in North Carolina
Greek Revival architecture in North Carolina
Government buildings completed in 1847
County courthouses in North Carolina
Buildings and structures in Camden County, North Carolina
National Register of Historic Places in Camden County, North Carolina
1847 establishments in North Carolina